Moshe Galanti, a kabbalist, was the first Rishon LeZion (Sephardic chief Rabbi of Israel).

Works
 Koheles Yaakov (1578), a commentary on Koheles
 Korban Chagiga
 Mafteach HaZohar (published in Venice)

References

External links
 brother of Moshe Galanti

Rishon LeZion (rabbi)
Kabbalists
Sephardi rabbis in Ottoman Palestine